Veluchami is a 1995 Tamil-language drama film written and directed by Arul. The film stars Sarath Kumar, Vineetha and newcomer Shruthi. It was released on 15 January 1995.

Plot 
Veluchami was brought by Periya Ayya, a rich man, since his mother died and his uncle Maruthu tried to sell him when he was a kid. Later, Periya Ayya's wife died while she was pregnant. By a miracle, the baby was still alive and this baby girl was named Chinnamma, Veluchami took care of her.

Many years later, Veluchami becomes a heart-of-gold man who helps the villagers, and he cannot tolerate injustice. His uncle Maruthu and his daughter Rasathi come to his village, Rasathi falls in love with Veluchami and she compels him to marry her. In the meantime, Veluchami clashes with a rich landlord and his son Raja.

Finally, Veluchami promises Rasathi to marry her. Chinnamma's dream is having a lot of children. So Veluchami looks for a groom for her, but Periya Ayya refuses for her marriage because he promises to God that he will give her to the temple if she survived. Veluchami cannot accept it and he marries her by force to save her dreams.

In fact, Periya Ayya lied and he tells the truth to Veluchami. Chinnamma's body is too weak for giving birth, so Periya Ayya tries to postpone his daughter's marriage as late as possible. Veluchami is then heartbroken. The rest of the story is what happens to Veluchami, Chinnamma and Rasathi.

Cast 

Sarath Kumar as Veluchami
Vineetha as Rasathi
Shruthi as Chinnamma
Goundamani as Kathavarayan
Senthil as Kannan
Jai Ganesh as Periya Ayya
Captain Raju
Kazan Khan as Raja
Manorama as Chinnamma's grandmother
Delhi Ganesh as Maruthu, Rasathi's father
Charuhasan
Pandu
K. R. Savithri
Naveena
Idichapuli Selvaraj
King Kong
Thennavan

Production 
Veluchami marked the directorial debut of Arul, who earlier assisted P. Vasu. Shruti, who acted in Hindi serial Sri Krishna made her Tamil debut with the film. The filming was entirely done at Pollachi.

Soundtrack 
The music was composed by Deva, with lyrics by Vairamuthu and Piraisoodan.

Reception 
K. Vijiyan of New Straits Times wrote, "Despite Sarath's good acting and two pretty actresses, there is nothing much to make this movie outstanding". R. P. R. of Kalki appreciated Sarath Kumar's performance and called the film's background score its biggest strength.

References

External links 

1990s Tamil-language films
1995 drama films
1995 films
Films scored by Deva (composer)
Indian drama films